"In Love with the World" is a song by Danish singer-songwriter Aura Dione from her second studio album, Before the Dinosaurs. It was written by Dione and Rick Nowels, and it was produced by Nowels and Devrim Karaoğlu. The song impacted Danish radio on 28 May 2012 as the album's third single. The song is about the sacrifices Dione had to make to pursue her career, and "letting go of someone who loves me, because maybe he doesn't love me enough to let me be free".

"In Love with the World" became Dione's fourth top 10 single in Denmark, where it peaked at number five.

Music video
The music video for "In Love with the World" premiered through MyVideo on 19 September 2012.

Chart performance
"In Love with the World" debuted at number 29 in Denmark on 29 June 2012. In its eight-week on the chart, the song rose to number five. In September it was certified gold by IFPI Denmark for sales of 15,000 digital downloads.

Live performances
Aura Dione performed the song for the first time in Denmark on late-night talk show Clement Søndag on 22 April 2012. She is set to perform the song on Danish game show Husk lige tandbørsten.

Track listing
Digital download
"In Love with the World" (David Jost Persson Radio Mix) – 4:11
"In Love with the World" (Virtual Riot Remix) – 4:55

Digital download — iTunes Store Special Version
"In Love with the World" (David Jost Persson Radio Mix) – 4:11
"In Love with the World" (Virtual Riot Remix) – 4:55
"In Love with the World" (Ali Payami Remix) – 4:49
"In Love with the World" – 3:28

Credits and personnel
Aura Dione – songwriter
Rick Nowels – songwriter, producer
Devrim Karaoğlu – producer, drums, bass, effects
Kieron Menzies – engineer, mixing
Nigel Lundemo – engineer
Patrick Warren – keyboards, dulcimer, string arrangement
Kai Blankenberg – mastering

Credits adapted from Before the Dinosaurs liner notes.

Charts and certifications

Charts

Certifications

Release history

References

2012 singles
Aura Dione songs
Songs written by Rick Nowels
Song recordings produced by Rick Nowels
2011 songs
Songs written by Aura Dione
Universal Music Group singles
Island Records singles